The Same Mist Here is the debut studio album by Slovak musician Karol Mikloš, delivered by G.A. Records on November 13, 1997. Produced by Ladislav Lučenič, it featured a cover version of "Some Girls Are Bigger Than Others" by The Smiths, released on the set as a hidden track.

Track listings

Awards

References

External links
 The Same Mist Here (Official website)
 The Same Mist Here on Bandcamp 
 The Same Mist Here on Discogs 

Karol Mikloš albums
1997 debut albums
G.A. Records albums